Lee Mi-ja (Hangul: 이미자; born October 30, 1941) is a South Korean singer. She is widely considered the most influential trot singer in Korean music history. Lee debuted in 1959 and rose to stardom with her 1964 best-selling song, "Camellia Girl." She has released over 500 albums during her career and is known as the "Queen of Elegy," after one of her most popular songs. In 2002, she became one of the first South Korean singers to perform in North Korea.

Awards
 2013 MBC Entertainment Awards - Achievement Award
 2013 Korean Popular Culture and Arts Awards - Eungwan Order of Cultural Merit

References

External links

1941 births
Living people
South Korean women singers
Singers from Seoul